The Central American and Caribbean (CAC) Championships  is an international track and field athletics event organised by the Central American and Caribbean Athletic Confederation (CACAC). Only athletes representing a member nation of the confederation may compete. Started in 1967, the event has been held every two years except for the 2007 edition which was held in 2008 instead.

Editions 
An overview of the early editions of the championships together with a list of the top three performing countries and the outstanding athletes was published.

See also
List of Central American and Caribbean Championships records
Central American and Caribbean Swimming Championships

References

External links
CACAC website
CAC website

 
Recurring sporting events established in 1967
Athletics